Rajendran Vivek (born 10 June 1991) is an Indian cricketer. He made his Twenty20 debut for Tamil Nadu in the 2018–19 Syed Mushtaq Ali Trophy on 21 February 2019.

References

External links
 

1991 births
Living people
Indian cricketers
Tamil Nadu cricketers
Place of birth missing (living people)